The Extraordinary and Plenipotentiary Ambassador of Peru to the Socialist Federal Republic of Yugoslavia was the official representative of the Republic of Peru to the Socialist Federal Republic of Yugoslavia.

After Peru recognized and established relations with Albania in late 1971, the ambassador in Belgrade became accredited to Albania (today accredited to the Peruvian Ambassador to Greece).

Peru first established economic and consular relations with the Yugoslav government-in-exile in October 1942, during World War II. Regardless, relations had already existed beforehand, as consulates existed in Belgrade and Zagreb by 1929. After the 1968 Peruvian coup d'état and the establishment of Juan Velasco Alvarado's Revolutionary Government, relations were renewed in 1968, and an embassy opened in Belgrade the same year.

After the breakup of Yugoslavia, Peru continued relations with the Federal Republic of Yugoslavia (Serbia and Montenegro). At the same time, Peru also recognized the other states that succeeded Yugoslavia, such as Croatia in 1993.

The embassy in Belgrade closed in December 2006, a couple of months after the independence of Montenegro, and the Peruvian Ambassador to Romania became accredited to Serbia until 2018, when the Peruvian Ambassador to Hungary became accredited instead after a series of reforms.

As of 2023, Peru is accredited to Serbia and Bosnia and Herzegovina from its embassy in Budapest; to Croatia, Montenegro and North Macedonia from its embassy in Bucharest; and to Slovenia from its embassy in Vienna.

Peru has not established relations with Kosovo. However, its recognition of the breakaway state after its declaration of independence in 2008 led to controversy with the Serbian authorities, who recalled their ambassador for a couple of months.

List of representatives

See also
List of ambassadors of Peru to Croatia
List of ambassadors of Peru to Bosnia and Herzegovina
List of ambassadors of Peru to Montenegro
List of ambassadors of Peru to North Macedonia
List of ambassadors of Peru to Serbia
List of ambassadors of Peru to Slovenia
List of ambassadors of Peru to the Soviet Union
List of ambassadors of Peru to Czechoslovakia
List of ambassadors of Peru to East Germany
List of ambassadors of Peru to Bulgaria
List of ambassadors of Peru to Albania
List of ambassadors of Peru to Hungary
List of ambassadors of Peru to Romania
List of ambassadors of Peru to Poland

References

Yugoslavia
Peru